Mark Dixon Kitchen (born 8 September 1950), known professionally as Mark Gable, is an Australian musician who serves as the frontman and a founding member of the rock band The Choirboys. The band was formed in Sydney in 1979.

Mark was born in Captains Flat, New South Wales.

Radio
Starting in 2012, Mark hosted The Awesome Eighties on 107.7 2GO in  The New South Wales Central Coast, with assistance from Mike Duncan. In 2008/9 Gable hosted and co-produced a weekly series for smoothfm, The Sunday Session where he interviewed many international and local artists. The show was aired on a Sunday afternoon in Sydney and Melbourne.

Personal life
In 2008 Gable become an ambassador for Beyondblue.

Gable is married to country singer-songwriter Melinda Schneider, they were married on September 10 2022 on Killcare Beach NSW after 14 years together. They had their first child Sullivan James Gable in August 2012. Gable has five children from a previous relationship.

Discography

The Choirboys Studio albums
Choirboys (1983)
Big Bad Noise (1988)
Midnight Sun (1991) 
Dancing on the Grave of Rock n' Roll (1994)
Yo-Yo (1996)
Evolver (2004)
Big Bad and Acoustic (2006)
So Easy (2007)

Quartets
"Handle with Care" (with Damien Leith, Bobby Flynn, and Ilan Kidron)

Television
Mark Gable appeared as one of "The 100" judges on All Together Now, an Australian reality television music competition on the Seven network.

References

External links 

 http://www.2gofm.com.au/
 http://www.beyondblue.org.au/

Living people
Australian musicians
People from New South Wales
1950 births